Enrique José Sarasola Marulanda (born 12 November 1963) is a Spanish equestrian. He competed at the 1992 Summer Olympics, the 1996 Summer Olympics and the 2000 Summer Olympics.

Notes

References

External links
 

1963 births
Living people
Spanish male equestrians
Olympic equestrians of Spain
Equestrians at the 1992 Summer Olympics
Equestrians at the 1996 Summer Olympics
Equestrians at the 2000 Summer Olympics
Sportspeople from Madrid

Spanish LGBT sportspeople